The 2018–19 Montenegrin Second League was the 13th season since the establishment of the Montenegrin Second League. The season ran from 12 August 2018 to May 2019. That was the first season with 10 participants.

Format of competition
A total of 10 teams participated in this edition of the Second League. The new members were FK Kom and FK Dečić who was relegated from 2017–18 Montenegrin First League, and winners of Montenegrin Third League playoffs - FK Arsenal Tivat.
This was the first season of Second CFL with 10 participants. At the end of the season, worst-placed team on the table would be directly relegated to the Montenegrin Third League.

Teams

The following 10 clubs competed in this season.

League table

Results

First half of the season

Second half of the season

Promotion play-offs
The 3rd-placed team (against the 10th-placed team of the First League) and the runners-up (against the 11th-placed team of the First League) will both compete in two-legged promotion play-offs after the end of the season.

Summary

Matches

Rudar won 4–1 on aggregate.

Kom won 2–0 on aggregate.

Top scorers

References

External links
Football Association of Montenegro - Official Site

Montenegrin Second League seasons
Montenegro
2018–19 in Montenegrin football